The 2017–18 Sultan Qaboos Cup was the 45th season of the national football competition of Oman. The winners of the competition earned a spot in the 2019 AFC Cup.

The competition started on 28 October 2017.

Qualification round

Round 1

Round 2

Round of 32

Round of 16

Quarter finals

First leg

Second leg

Semi-finals

First leg

Second leg

Finals

References

External links
Soccerway

Sultan Qaboos Cup seasons
Oman
2017–18 in Omani football